The Shioc River is a river in north east Wisconsin that flows through the village of Shiocton and into the Wolf River. The source is near the census-designated place of Navarino, in the town of Navarino.

See also
List of Wisconsin rivers

References

Rivers of Wisconsin